Marcinko is a surname. It is most common in the US where approximately 1 in 270,000 people have the surname. Notable people with the surname include:

 Nadia Marcinko (born 1986), U.S. Gulfstream commercial pilot
 Richard Marcinko (born 1940), United States Navy officer
 Tomáš Marcinko (born 1988), Slovak ice hockey player